New Boy is a 2007 Irish short film based on the short story by Irish novelist, dramatist and screenwriter, Roddy Doyle. It received an Academy Award nomination for Best Live Action Short Film. The film is about a young boy's experience as he moves from a rural town in Africa to Ireland: a new country, a different school system and a whole new set of customs.

Plot 
Joseph is the new student at a school in Ireland, having just moved to Ireland from an unidentified country in Africa. Throughout the film he is silent, in deep contrast to the flashbacks of his life back in Africa where he is bright and talkative. In these flashbacks Joseph's father is the schoolteacher, it is revealed that his father was shot and killed for educating young children.

Joseph struggles to fit in with the other students. In particular two boys named Seth Quinn and Christian Kelly give him trouble, Christian sits behind Joseph in the classroom. He calls Joseph Live Aid, a reference to the benefit concert to raise funds for relief of the Ethiopian Famine. Christian goads Joseph into grabbing onto his finger and throwing him to the ground, getting Joseph into trouble.

A girl named Hazel O'Hara has caught Joseph's interest. She repeatedly tells the teacher that Christian has been giving Joseph trouble yet the teachers pays barely any heed. When the children go out for recess, milk is thrown at Joseph before he is surrounded by a throng of children. Seth and Christian attempt to fight Joseph before the teacher intercepts them.

As the three boys stand in the hallway, they begin to bond by mocking the teacher's eccentric ways. They laugh as Hazel O'Hara attempts to persuade the teacher that Christian is guilty. Joseph finally smiles, knowing he has now made friends.

References

External links
 

2007 films
Irish short films
Films directed by Steph Green
Films with screenplays by Steph Green
Films based on short fiction
2000s English-language films